Brian Austin Green (born Brian Green; July 15, 1973) is an American actor, rapper, television personality and podcaster, best known for his portrayal of David Silver on the television series Beverly Hills, 90210 (1990–2000). Green was also a series regular on Terminator: The Sarah Connor Chronicles,  Freddie, Wedding Band, and Anger Management.

Early life
Green was born in Van Nuys, California, the son of Joyce and George Green. He has some Scottish ancestry. His middle name, "Austin", was added to differentiate himself from another actor when he joined the Screen Actor's Guild as a child. Green grew up in North Hollywood and attended North Hollywood High School, after attending the Hamilton High School Academy of Music.

Career
Prior to his role on Beverly Hills, 90210, Green had a recurring role for three seasons (1986–1989) on the CBS primetime soap opera Knots Landing, playing the role of Brian Cunningham, the son of Abby Cunningham Ewing (Donna Mills). He reprised his role in the television miniseries Knots Landing: Back to the Cul-de-Sac (1997). He appeared in the 1987 pilot of Good Morning, Miss Bliss as Adam Montcrief.

Producer Aaron Spelling stated that Green was cast as David Silver because of their similar personalities. The character was often scripted to reflect Green's own interests. As the series progressed, the character began to experiment with hip hop music and DJing, as did Green himself. In 1996, Green dropped "Austin" from his professional name and attempted a career as a rapper, releasing one album, titled One Stop Carnival, produced by The Pharcyde member Slimkid3. In the 1990s, he was a guest star on Growing Pains, Parker Lewis Can't Lose, Melrose Place, Saved by the Bell: The College Years, Fantastic Four, Mad TV, Biker Mice from Mars, Malibu Shores, Sabrina, the Teenage Witch and Knots Landing: Back to the Cul-de-Sac.

Green appeared briefly in the multiple award-winning Showtime drama series Resurrection Blvd. as Luke Bonner (2001–2004), a police officer attending law school. He had a cameo on Hope & Faith where he met Megan Fox; they started dating in 2004. He appeared on the ABC sitcom Freddie (2005) starring Freddie Prinze, Jr. He was a guest star on The Twilight Zone, Las Vegas and CSI: Crime Scene Investigation. He also appeared alongside former 90210 cast member Ian Ziering in the Tony Scott film Domino as parodies of themselves.
Green appeared in a horror short called Grace, which was set around a miscarriage gone bad, and features Gilmore Girls actress Liza Weil as his love interest. It premiered at the Fangoria Weekend of Horrors on June 2, 2006, and was reworked as a full-length feature film (2009). He was a guest star on George Lopez in 2006 as Chris.

Green played Derek Reese in Terminator: The Sarah Connor Chronicles, a Resistance fighter sent to the past by the future John Connor. The character is the older brother of Kyle Reese (John Connor's father) and paternal uncle of John. Green was a recurring character in season 1 but became a regular at the start of season 2, following a positive response from critics and fans. His character is killed by a Terminator in the penultimate episode, but another Derek from an alternate timeline is introduced in the series finale and would have remained on the show if it had been renewed for a third season.

Green guest-starred on the season 7 finale of CSI: Miami as Anthony Green. Green was cast in The CW's new drama pilot Body Politic, along with Minka Kelly, Gabrielle Union, and Jason Dohring. The series was not picked up for fall 2009. Green said in an interview that he was co-producing a big screen adaptation of Fathom, starring Megan Fox. On September 27, 2009, Green made a guest appearance on the television series Saturday Night Live in a skit involving girlfriend (later his wife) Megan Fox. In the skit Green played a version of the Transformer Bumblebee in which Bumblebee is merely a man wearing a Bumblebee mask. Green was cast as Clay in One Tree Hills seventh season. Green then left the cast because of scheduling conflicts and the role was then given to Robert Buckley; Green instead starred as superhero Callan in the Patrick Durham-directed movie Cross, which was released to DVD and download in May 2011.

In 2009, Green was cast as John Corben/Metallo in Smallville. He appeared in three episodes in the ninth season between 2009 and 2010, the first being the ninth-season premiere episode "Savior". The character is a war-time reporter, similar to the Silver Age John Corben. As a back-story for this version, he had been recently stationed in Afghanistan. When he meets Lois Lane, he expresses his distaste for vigilantes, particularly "the Blur" (Clark Kent) due to the hero saving a prison bus only for a convict to escape and slay his sister. After being struck in a hit and run, Corben awoke to find himself possessing cybernetic enhancements - including an artificial heart powered by kryptonite. After kidnapping Lois Lane as bait, the villain was confronted and defeated by Clark Kent. It was subsequently revealed in the episode "Conspiracy" that Zod's disciples were behind Corben's revival. Corben is "reactivated" in the episode "Upgrade" after Luthorcorp scientists are able to correct the initial design flaw in the Kryptonite heart that causes an adrenal overload and resulting psychosis. Though Green had expressed willingness to reprise the character in the 10th and final season, the character was portrayed by a body double for his final appearance in the episode "Prophecy" - presumably due to budget and the cameo nature of the appearance. Green's likeness would be used however for the character's appearance in the Season Eleven comic continuation.

In 2010, Green appeared in a multi-episode story arc on the ABC series Desperate Housewives. He plays Keith Watson, Bree's contractor and lover for the first part of the season.

In 2012, Green had a guest appearance in the sitcom Anger Management playing Sean, the boyfriend of Charlie's ex-wife, Jen in the first episode of the show. This episode broke a ratings record with 5.74 million viewers on its series debut night and ranks as the most-watched sitcom premiere in cable history. He returned to the show in the episode "Charlie Breaks Up With Kate" when Jen gets back with Sean. In June 2013, Green was promoted to series regular.

Green was a guest star in the finale episode of the second season of Happy Endings. He played Chris, who meets dateless Penny via Skype. He returned in the first episode of the third season "Cazsh Dummy Spillionaires". In the same year, Green starred in the television series Wedding Band, about a group of friends who perform at weddings. In the TBS comedy, Green plays Tommy, the frontman for Mother of the Bride, a group of four buddies who aren't ready to give up the dream of being rock stars. On January 22, 2013, TBS cancelled the series after one season because of low ratings.

In 2020, Green competed on season four of The Masked Singer as "Giraffe"; he was eliminated in his second appearance. Robin Thicke joined him in his encore of Kool and the Gang's "Get Down on It". He also served as a panelist on its spin-off series The Masked Dancer.

In September 2021, Green was announced as one of the celebrities competing on season 30 of Dancing with the Stars. His professional partner was girlfriend, Sharna Burgess, and he was the third celebrity to be eliminated from the show, ultimately placing 13th.

Personal life
Green won the celebrity portion of the Grand Prix of Long Beach in early 2010.

In April 2017, Green created a podcast titled With Brian Austin Green.

In June 2022, he revealed that he is suffering from a strong case of ulcerative colitis, which is causing strong health problems.

Relationships
Green dated his Beverly Hills, 90210 co-star Tiffani Thiessen from 1992 to 1995.

In 1999, Green started dating his Beverly Hills, 90210 castmate Vanessa Marcil, whom he met on set. The two became engaged in July 2001 and had a son born in 2002. They planned to wed that year, but ended their relationship in 2003.

In 2004, Green began dating actress Megan Fox, having first met on the set of Hope & Faith when he was 30 years old and she was 18. Fox said Green was initially hesitant to enter a relationship with her due to the age difference. Fox said, "I had to convince him that I was slightly more responsible and well-spoken and had other things to bring to the table besides being 18." They became engaged in 2006 but broke off their engagement in February 2009. Later that year, their home was targeted by a group of fashion-motivated criminals known as "The Bling Ring", who initially targeted them to steal Fox's designer clothes.

In June 2010, Green and Fox announced they were engaged again, and several days later on June 24, the two wed at the Four Seasons resort on the island of Hawaii. They have three sons together, born in 2012, 2014, and 2016. Fox filed for divorce from Green on August 21, 2015, a few days after the couple announced their separation. They reconciled in early 2016. On April 25, 2019, Fox filed to dismiss the divorce in Los Angeles, California. In May 2020, Green announced that he and Fox had separated after nearly 10 years of marriage. In November 2020, Fox filed for divorce from Green for a second time. They finalized their divorce on October 15, 2021.

Green has been dating professional dancer Sharna Burgess since October 2020. They announced they were expecting their first child together on February 4, 2022. Their son was born on June 28, 2022.

Philanthropy
Both Green and ex-wife Megan Fox are supporters of Generosity Water, and have funded the creation of over ten water wells for the organization. Through his podcast, Green organized a charity event to benefit the organization on September 1, 2018.

Green hosted a second fundraiser for the organization the following year, on August 31, 2019. To coincide with the release of BH90210, the event was Beverly Hills, 90210 themed. It was a recorded podcast at Torrance High School, which served as West Beverly High in the series. Green's fellow Beverly Hills, 90210 cast members Ian Ziering, Gabrielle Carteris, Carol Potter, Douglas Emerson, Joe E. Tata, and Christine Elise McCarthy were in attendance. Tori Spelling was initially slated to attend, but ultimately recorded a video message in the wake of scheduling conflicts. Jason Priestley and James Eckhouse recorded video messages as well.

In October 2019, Green and Fox cohosted the Omaze "Fight4theAmazon" campaign.

In 2021 Green and girlfriend Sharna Burgess took part in the Search4Smiles campaign supporting the Trueheart Search Engine, which donates 80% of their profits to charity.

Paparazzi lawsuit
In March 2012, photographer Delbert Shaw sued Green and ex-wife Fox in Los Angeles County Superior Court for allegedly assaulting him after he took photographs of the couple while Green and Fox were vacationing in Hawaii in 2010. In June 2012, Green said he was defending himself against Shaw and that Fox should not be included in the lawsuit.

Filmography

Film

Television

Awards and nominations 
Nominated for Best Young Actor Starring in a Television Drama Series for Knots Landing (1987)
Nominated for Best Young Actor in a Nighttime Drama Series for Knots Landing (1988)
Won Best Young Actor Starring in a TV Movie, Pilot or Special for  Adventures in Babysitting (1989)
Nominated for Best Young Actor Supporting or Recurring Role For a TV Series for Beverly Hills, 90210 (1991)
Won Best Young Actor Co-Starring in a Television Series for Beverly Hills, 90210 (1992)
Won Palm Beach International Film Festival Special Jury Prize for a feature film directorial debut for Fish Without a Bicycle (2003)
Won Best Feature Philadelphia FirstGlance Film Festival for Fish Without a Bicycle (2003)
Won Prize Best Dramatic Feature Los Angeles DIY Film Festival for Fish Without a Bicycle (2003)

Discography
 One Stop Carnival (1996)
 Esthero: Wikked Lil' Grrrls (2005) (drums)
 Wedding Band (2012–2013) (soundtrack released exclusively as singles on iTunes as Mother of the Bride)

References

External links

 
 With Brian Austin Green Podcast

20th-century American male actors
21st-century American male actors
Alexander Hamilton High School (Los Angeles) alumni
American male child actors
American male film actors
American podcasters
American male rappers
American male television actors
American people of Scottish descent
Epic Records artists
Living people
Male actors from Los Angeles
People from Van Nuys, Los Angeles
Rappers from Los Angeles
21st-century American rappers
21st-century American male musicians
1973 births
North Hollywood High School alumni